Focus is the Korean debut extended play by the South Korean duo Jus2. It was released by JYP Entertainment on March 5, 2019 with "Focus On Me" serving as the album's lead single. The Japanese version was released on April 10, 2019.

Track listing
Credits adapted from Naver Music.

Music video
The music video for single was released on March 4, 2019. Within 24 hours, the video had surpassed 8 million views on YouTube. As of March 2022 the music video has received over 42 million views and 0.9 million likes on YouTube and 16 million streams on Spotify. On March 8, the dance practice video for Focus On Me was released on Got7's official YouTube channel.
As of March 2022, the dance practice video has received over 0.8 million views YouTube.

Charts

Album

Weekly charts

Single

"Focus On Me" Weekly charts

Sales

Release history

References

2019 EPs